is an anime and visual novel by Longshot told in parallel novel style that follows the events around three women. Interlude was originally released for the Sega Dreamcast on March 13, 2003, a rare occurrence for visual novels, as most are released for Windows first. PlayStation 2 and Windows ports were later also released. The PS2 version received a 'The Best' budget price re-release on March 1, 2007.

Characters
The player assumes the role of a (usually) anonymous protagonist in the series. Sometimes he takes the name Naoya Aizawa, such as in the animated adaption.

The three main women are:
, a girl who is going insane. Aya is a skilled archer and lives alone in a town empty of people. Aya thinks that if she acts that if everything is normal, then everyone would return.
 an office lady.
, a childhood friend of the protagonist actuated by the player in the game.

Adaptations 
A three-episode OVA directed by Tatsuya Nagamine was produced and licensed by Toei Animation. It premiered in 2004 on SkyPerfecTV and was released on DVD in 2005. It was distributed in English speaking countries by Geneon Entertainment, with a dub produced by Kaleidoscope Entertainment. A Japanese-audio English-subtitle version was made available for streaming free on Crunchyroll in April 2011.

OVA cast

Episodes
Episode 1
High school student Naoya Aizawa has recurring visions of himself and his long time friend Tama in the aftermath of a catastrophic event where Tama is dying. There are rumors of shadow creatures following and threatening people, and one evening Naoya, Tama and her schoolfriends Kim and Haru, see a shadowy figure carrying a bow and give chase. Tama literally runs into Izumi Marufuji and her two friends, Kaoruko Minegishi and Yuki Takase who all work at City Hall and are also chasing the girl. The group are confronted by a zombie-like woman and chase her, only to find themselves in a deserted city with other zombies menacing them. They are saved by Sugiura who claims to be a monster hunter who shoots the zombies. A young girl, Mutsuki, orders "Hedgehog... reBoot.." and dog-like flaming beast attacks Sugiura. Naoya awakes, realizing it was a dream. He visits City Hall seeking Marufuji, but she and her team have no recollection of the events with the zombies although she does have a photo of the "Pandora project".  Naoya again finds himself in the deserted city where a young woman with long black hair with a bow and arrow saves him from an attack by Hedgehog.

Episode 2
Naoya finds himself in a deserted Moon City and sees multiple darks shadowy creatures called fairies. He is attacked by the General and Buta (The Pig) but is rescued by the young woman with a bow whom he recalls seeing on a train platform in his dreams. She takes Naoya to her home and explains that until the day they saw each other on a railway platform, she has seen no-one in her world. She reveals her name is Aya Watsuji and she carries on with her life as normal, catching the train to school each day to study alone. Naoya encourages her to attend an amusement park, and plans to return with her to his world. They return to Moon City where the encounter shadowy fairy creatures and Marufuji's City Hall team and Sugiura. General and Buta again attack them, badly wounding Sugiura who defends them but seems unconcerned by his injuries. They head for City Hall to research Pandora and Naoya receives a phone call warning him not to remember. Again they encounter Mutsuki who sends Hedghog after them.

Episode 3
Aya destroys Hedgehog and the group enter City Hall where Ikuo Fuyuki explains that Naoya is one of only 12 survivors of an apocalyptic event, and the world he inhabits is created by the mind of Mitsuki who has been kept in stasis. Whenever reality begins to tear the fabric of the illusion, the shadowy fairies appear. He warns that Aya can destroy their world. Aya fires an arrow at Fuyuki but Naoya steps in front and is shot instead. He awakes to find himself back in the past, living at his brother Ikuo Fuyuki and his wife Miyako's house with his sister Mitsuki and her dog, Hedgehog. Naoya begins to realize that he wanted the world to exist for his childhood friend Tama who had died, but understands that it was false reality and that he wants to be with Aya. Aya fires an arrow which destroys Hedgehog and shatters the illusion. Naoya apologizes to Mitsuki and returns to the real world, waking up in the ruins of the facility built by Fuyuki. He heads off into the wasteland, following footsteps in the sand.

Notes

References

External links 
 Interlude at Shall Luck 
 Interlude OVA Official website 
 
 

2003 video games
2004 anime OVAs
Dreamcast games
Geneon USA
Japan-exclusive video games
PlayStation 2 games
Toei Animation original video animation
Video games developed in Japan
Visual novels
Windows games